Kang Eun-jin (born September 16, 1982) is a South Korean actress.

Filmography

Awards and nominations

References

External links 
 
 
 
 
 

1982 births
Living people
South Korean film actresses